Philippine Span Asia Carrier Corporation (PSACC), formerly branded as Sulpicio Lines, Inc. (SLI), is a major shipping line in the Philippines. PSACC is one of the largest domestic shipping and container companies in the Philippines in terms of the number of vessels operated and gross tonnage. The company provides inter-island cargo services throughout the major ports and cities in the Philippines.

History
Philippine Span Asia Carrier Corporation (PSACC) was established as Sulpicio Lines by Go Guioc So. Commonly known as Sulpicio Go, Go was a Chinese merchant from Amoy (now Xiamen) who emigrated to the Philippines in 1919 with his siblings. With his brother he set up a shipping enterprise in Eastern Visayas. In 1953, Go served as the managing partner of Carlos A. Gothong Lines, Inc.

Sulpicio Go established his own venture with his sons by founding Sulpicio Lines in September 1973, starting with a fleet of 17 vessels, 1 tugboat and 5 barges. Sulpicio Lines catered to a niche market, opening tertiary and developmental passenger routes to isolated communities in Central and Eastern Visayas.

Sulpicio Lines grew to be the largest domestic shipping company in the Philippines, with a fleet of 22 passenger and cargo vessels and a market share of 20 percent of domestic sea traffic in the Philippines in 1988.

The company experienced multiple marine disasters, including the 1987 sinking of the Doña Paz, the sinking of the Doña Marilyn in 1988, the sinking of the Princess of the Orient in 1998, and the 2008 sinking of the Princess of The Stars during the occurrence of Typhoon Fengshen (PAGASA name: Frank). In 2009, the PSACC adopted its current name discontinuing the use of "Sulpicio Lines to refer to the company.

In January 2015, almost 7 years after the sinking of MV Princess of the Stars, the Maritime Industry Authority decided to revoke the company's certificate of public convenience (CPC), which meant that the company could no longer legally transport passengers.

Ports of Call
Philippine Span Asia Carrier's main ports of call are the cities of Manila and Cebu. Other ports of call are the cities of Butuan, Cagayan de Oro, Cotabato, Davao, Dipolog, Dumaguete, General Santos, Iloilo, Ozamis, Surigao, Tagbilaran, and Zamboanga. It also includes the towns of Estancia, Jagna, and Nasipit.

Fleet
PSACC once had passenger RoRo (Roll on - Roll off) vessels. However, because of their disreputable public image after a series of ferry disasters, PSACC had to focus solely on cargo shipping.

Current
Span Asia 1
Span Asia 2
Span Asia 3
Span Asia 5
Span Asia 7
Span Asia 9
Span Asia 10
Span Asia 11
Span Asia 12
Span Asia 19
Span Asia 20
Span Asia 21
Span Asia 22
Span Asia 23
Span Asia 25 
Span Asia 27
Span Asia 29
Span Asia 30
Span Asia 31
Span Asia 32
Span Asia 33

Former

Doña Paz (caught fire after colliding with an oil tanker, resulting in over 4000 lives lost: the deadliest peacetime maritime disaster in history)
Doña Marilyn (sank October 24, 1988 in typhoon Unsang. 391 dead or missing; 300 survivors)
Philippine Princess (caught fire in 1997, later broken-up, Former Flagship 1984 - 1988)
Cagayan Princess (sold to Roble Shipping Inc. as M/V Theresian Stars)
Cebu Princess (sold to Roble Shipping Inc. as M/V Joyful Stars)
Dipolog Princess (sold to breakers in China)
Cotabato Princess (sold & broken-up in Villono Shipyard)
Iloilo Princess (sunk in Pier 7, sold & broken-up)
Nasipit Princess (sold & broken-up)
Palawan Princess (sold & broken-up)
Tacloban Princess (sold & caught fire, later declared a total loss)
Filipina Princess (sold to breakers in China, Former Flagship 1988 - 1993)
Princess of The Paradise (sold to breakers in China)
Princess of The Caribbean (sold to breakers in China)
Princess of The Ocean (sold to breakers in China)
Princess of The Stars (capsized & sunk in 2008 near San Fernando, Romblon, with the loss over 800 lives. Was later broken up in Navotas, Former Flagship 2004 - 2008)
Princess of the Orient (sunk near Batangas during a typhoon in 1998, over 70 died, with almost 80 people missing, Former Flagship 1993 - 1998)
Princess of The Pacific (sold & broken-up)
Princess of New Unity (sold & broken-up sometime in the 2000s)
Princess of the World (caught fire in Zamboanga)
Princess of The Universe (sold to breakers in India, Former Flagship 1998 - 2004)
Princess of The South (sold & broken-up, Former Flagship 2008 - 2014)
Princess of the Earth (Sold to Trans-Asia Shipping as Transasia 10)
Span Asia 17 (Former name MV Sulpicio Express Siete. Was involved in a collision with the ferry MV St. Thomas Aquinas on August 16, 2013)

See also 

 List of maritime disasters involving the Philippine Span Asia Carrier Corporation

References

Ferries of the Philippines
Shipping companies of the Philippines
Transportation in Mindanao
Transportation in Cebu
Transportation in the Visayas
Companies based in Cebu City
1973 establishments in the Philippines